Regina Rosemont is a provincial electoral district for the Legislative Assembly of Saskatchewan, Canada.  It is represented by Trent Wotherspoon of the New Democratic Party, who first won the seat in the 2007 election.

Members of the Legislative Assembly

Election results

2003–present

1991

References

External links 
Website of the Legislative Assembly of Saskatchewan
Map of Regina Rosemont riding as of 2016

Politics of Regina, Saskatchewan
Saskatchewan provincial electoral districts